Ningal (Sumerian: "Great Queen"), also known as Nikkal in Akkadian, was a Mesopotamian goddess of Sumerian origin regarded as the wife of the moon god, Nanna/Sin. She was particularly closely associated with his main cult centers, Ur and Harran, but they were also worshiped together in other cities of Mesopotamia. She was particularly venerated by the Third Dynasty of Ur and later by kings of Larsa.

Character  and iconography
While Ningal was a major deity in the Mesopotamian pantheon and worship of her is attested from all periods of Mesopotamian history, her character was largely “passive and supportive” according to researchers. She was the tutelary goddess of Ur alongside her husband, and was referred to as its "lady" or "mother" on occasion.

Based on some of Ningal's epithets it has been proposed that she was in part an astral deity, much like her husband.

A type of bird, u5-bi2, was possibly associated with Ningal, though the evidence is inconclusive. Proposed identities of this animal include the greylag goose and the whooper swan, but it is assumed that even in Ur, statues of a goddess accompanied by a water bird of the genus Anserini, well known from excavations, were more likely to represent Nanshe. Ningal was also called zirru, a term which might designate a female bird. Some en priestesses of Nanna, especially Sargon's daughter Enheduanna, were also referred to as zirru.

Ningal's iconography is not consistent, and she was depicted in many different ways. On the stele of Ur-Nammu, Ningal is depicted sitting in her husband's lap. This type of depictions was meant to display the intimate nature of the connection between the deities and highlight their ability to act in unison, and is also attested for Bau and Ningirsu. Depictions of Ningal sitting on a lion throne are also known. Additionally it has been proposed that in art Ningal could be represented as a seated goddess accompanied by the lunar crescent, a symbol of her husband.

The term "hand of Ningal" referred to an unidentified skin disease. Analogous terms are attested for various other deities, for example Sin, Adad, Shamash and Geshtinanna.

Association with other deities
Ningal's mother was the goddess Ningikuga (Sumerian: "lady of the pure reed"), commonly identified as a consort of Enki. The god list An = Anum identifies her with Damkina directly, though in an Old Babylonian forerunner to it she is only another deity in the circle of Enki. She is directly referred to as Ningal's mother in a single balbale composition and in an emesal love song. Ningikuga could also function as the name of a manifestation of Ningal, addressed as "the pure one who purifies the earth."

Ningal's husband was the lunar god Nanna (Akkadian Sin). They were sometimes invoked as a couple in cylinder seal inscriptions, though not as commonly as Shamash and Aya or Adad and Shala. Derivatives of Ningal were regarded as married to other moon gods in Hurrian (Kusuh or Umbu), Hittite and Ugaritic (Yarikh) sources.

Their most notable children were Inanna/Ishtar, representing the morning star, and Utu/Shamash, representing the sun. The view that Inanna was a daughter of Nanna and Ningal is the most commonly attested tradition regarding her parentage.

Due to her identification with Inanna/Ishtar, the Hurrian and Elamite goddess Pinikir is referred to as a daughter of Sin and Ningal in a text written in Akkadian but found in a corpus of Hurro-Hittite rituals.

Further relatively commonly attested children of Ningal and Nanna include the goddesses Amarra-uzu and Amarra-he'ea, known from the god list An = Anum, Ningublaga (the city god of Ki'abrig) and  Numushda (the city god of Kazallu).

In a single Maqlû incantation, Manzat (Akkadian and Elamite goddess of the rainbow) appears as the sister of Shamash, and by extension as daughter of his parents, Ningal and Sin.

In late sources from Harran Nuska was regarded as the son of Ningal and her husband.

The god list An = Anum attests that like many other deities Ningal was believed to have a sukkal (attendant deity), though the reading of their name, dMEkà-kàME, remains uncertain. Manfred Krebernik assumes this deity is identical with the divine messenger Kakka.  Richard L. Litke points out that the gloss is unlikely to point at an otherwise unknown pronunciation of the sign ME, and assumes that the deity in mention was named Meme, while an alternate version of the list had Kakka in the  same role. He assumes that in this case Kakka should be understood as a deity elsewhere equated with Ninkarrak, distinct from the male messenger god. A medicine goddess named Kakka, associated with Ninkarrak and Ninshubur, is attested in sources from Mari.

In a single inscription, Ningal, identified as "of Nippur," appears alongside the Nisaba-like scribe goddess Ninimma known from the same city.

Worship
Ningal was worshiped in the major cult centers of her husband, Ur and Harran, as well as in Babylon, Isin, Kisurra, Larsa, Sippar, Urum and Tutub. Her connection with Ur was particularly close, and she and the city could be compared to a mother and her child in literary texts. She also appears in city laments, bemoaning its destruction. The Ur-Namma stele indicates that Ningal was likely the highest ranked goddess in the pantheon of Ur during his reign.

Shulgi of Ur referred to Ningal as his mother. He also rebuilt the temple of Nanna in Ga’esh, Ekarzida (Sumerian: "house, pure quay") as a Ningal temple in which she was known by the epithet Nin-Urimma, "lady of Ur."

In the Old Babylonian period the temple of Ningal in Ur was combined with the Gipar, the residence of the en priestess of Nanna, into a single complex. The ceremonial name Egarku (Sumerian: "house, sacred boudoir") was retained for her major sanctuary within it, and appears in inscriptions of kings such as Nur-Adad and Warad-Sin. Another shrine dedicated to her in the Gipar was Eidlurugukalamma (Sumerian: "house of the river ordeal of the land"), rebuilt by Silli-Adad. In the Kassite period, Kurigalzu I built another temple of Ningal in Ur, but its name is presently unknown.

Kings of Larsa in the Isin-Larsa period, especially Warad-Sin and Rim-Sin, considered Ur a city of particular religious and political importance and were active worshipers of Ningal. A joint cult center of Sin and Ningal whose location is uncertain was also patronized by kings of the Manana dynasty of Kish.

Letters from the reign of Ashurbanipal indicate that Ningal and Sin replaced Inanna and Dumuzi as the tutelary deities of Kissig in late periods.

An Aramaic center of the cult of Ningal, known from sources from the first millennium BCE, was Nereb (Al-Nayrab) located in the proximity of modern Aleppo. It was most likely under the influence of the temple in Harran. In Harran itself, a sanctuary of Ningal named Egipar existed according to documents from the reign of Ashurbanipal, but it was a part of Sin's Ehulhul rather than a separate temple.

Ningal was still worshiped in Ur during the neo-Babylonian period. Her temple there was rebuilt by Nabonidus. Additionally a bīt ḫilṣi, "house of pressing" (assumed to be a pharmacy accompanied by a garden where the ingredients for various medicines were grown) located in the same city was associated with Ningal.

Outside Mesopotamia

The cult of Ningal spread from Mesopotamia to other areas, including Hurrian kingdoms such as Kizzuwatna, as well as Ugarit and the Hittite Empire. The notion of Ningal being the wife of the moon god and mother of the sun god was retained by cultures who adopted her into their pantheons.

A number of Hittite theophoric names invoking her are known, with a notable example being queen Nikkal-mati and her daughter Ashmu-Nikkal. Similar evidence is available from Ugarit.

The Ugaritic Nikkal (Nkl in texts written in the alphabetic script), or Nikkal-wa-Ib, belonged both to the Ugaritic and Hurrian pantheons of the city, and is attested as the wife of both local moon god Yarikh and his Hurrian counterpart Kušuḫ. In an Ugaritic myth she is associated with an otherwise unknown god Ḫrḫb, who was possibly regarded as her father.  He is assumed to be of Hurrian origin, much like at least some elements of the composition itself.

Non-Hurrian non-Ugaritic attestations of Nikkal from areas where West Semitic languages were spoken in the second and first millennia BCE are very infrequent, though it might be the result of selective preservation.

In Egypt Nikkal is only attested in a single magical papyrus, in which she appears as a foreign deity implored to heal a specific affliction.

References

Bibliography

Mesopotamian goddesses
Ur